RMF FM (abriviation to Radio Muzyka Fakty FM, translation: Radio Music Facts FM; previously: Radio Małopolska Fun FM; translation: Radio Lesser Poland Fun FM) is the first commercial radio station in Poland, currently broadcasting in AC radio format. RMF FM started broadcasting on 15 January 1990 in Kraków. The current director is Tadeusz Sołtys. The radio is wholly owned by the German Bauer Verlagsgruppe. It is the first private radio station in Poland and is available throughout the country.

History

Origin 
The main founder of the radio was Stanislaw Tyczynski, who initiated Radio Solidarność Małopolska (Solidarity Radio Lesser Poland) in 1981. From 1984 to 1989 he lived in France. After returning to Kraków on 9 June 1989, together with a group of Solidarity activists, he established the Krakowska Fundacja Komunikacji Społecznej (KFKS, Kraków Foundation of Social Communication), aiming to "propagate free social communication, reliable and objective information, free expression of opinions and views".

The first application for the frequency and radio license was submitted as early as November 1989; however, it was rejected. Shortly afterwards, a second application was submitted for the retransmission of Fun Radio, citing similar broadcasts by TV Ostankino and Rai Uno in Kraków. This time the application was accepted, and the station was given the frequency 70.06 MHz.

1990s 
The rebroadcast was launched on January 15, 1990. The first song to appear on the air was "Africa" by the band Toto. Initially, the station was housed in two apartments, but after eight months the broadcast was moved to the Kościuszko Mound. At the same time, the first Polish commercials appeared (partly made up by the journalists to give the impression of great interest on the part of advertisers) and regular news services from Kraków, and the first truckload of equipment donated by Fun Radio arrived at the station. The programme gradually expanded - from 24 September, hourly news and programmes from 5:00 to 9:00 (from 12 November to 14:00) and from 22:00 to 1:00 at night were broadcast from Kraków. The hosts of the programmes included Ewa Drzyzga, Piotr Metz, Marcin Wrona, Tadeusz Sołtys, Andrzej Sołtysik and Bogdan Rymanowski.

Since 7th January 1991 Radio Free Europe services were broadcast on RMF and on 14th January Paweł Pawlik became the first field correspondent, broadcasting from Tarnów. On 25 February the first foreign correspondent appeared in Paris, in April an outpost was opened in Vienna and in June in the Warsaw Marriott Hotel - the first employee was Hieronim Wrona. On July 1, 1991 the station's transmission truck, an off-road Toyota Land Cruiser, made its debut. On December 11, 1991 the car took part in the first big event - the fire of the Krakow Philharmonic Hall.

In October 1991 the cooperation between RMF and KFKS ended. This was due to the fact that the French shareholders did not accept only a 33% stake in the company, as allowed by Polish law, and were interested only in full ownership. As a result, the retransmission of Fun Radio ended.

On 20 April 1992 the station broadcast The Freddie Mercury Tribute Concert featuring Metallica, Elton John, David Bowie, U2 and Guns N' Roses live. On 26 June 1992 the second studio was opened and in July 1992 the correspondent's office in Warsaw. Also on 15th July FM was added to RMF for the first time. On 12 September the first music charts appeared, on 2 November the station appeared on the satellite (thanks to the agreement with MTV Europe it occupied the second audio subcarrier of this station) and in December a second RMF FM transmitter was launched - in Katowice (on 71.75 MHz).

On 16 January 1993 a RMF FM branch in Katowice was launched (the first local branch outside Kraków). On 20 January appeared a correspondent in Washington DC, on 8 March began production of its own program in Częstochowa. On 1 September the first morning program "Ni w 5 ni w 9" was launched, which on 30 August 1999 changed into "Wstawaj, szkoda dnia" broadcast until today.

In February 1994 the National Broadcasting Council (KRRiT) decided to grant the station a nationwide license. On April 15, an outlet in Brussels was launched. On May 26 the concession included the possibility of local splits. On November 1st a local program was launched in Łódź and on December 19th a local station was launched in Warsaw - the broadcast was "turned on" by the then director of the National Broadcasting Council using a laptop with the Internet.

In 1995 local affiliates were launched in Wrocław (2 January), Poznań (6 February), Lublin (5 April), Opole, Zakopane (17 and 22 July respectively), Rzeszów (1 August), Trójmiasto (9 September), Szczecin (2 October) and Bydgoszcz (27 November; in September 2008 the affiliate was moved to Toruń) as well as correspondent offices in Tokyo (13 March) and Tel Aviv (1 May). In June 1995, the station became the owner of the first satellite radio news truck in Poland, which it used for the first tour of the "Inwazja mocy" series, which lasted throughout the summer. During the Inwazja concert in Tychy on August 15, 1995, a helicopter rented by the station crashed and the pilot was killed.

From 5 February 1996, the station had a correspondent in London, and from 1 March also in Moscow. At the same time, "Polityczne grafitii" appeared, broadcast simultaneously on RMF FM and Polsat. At the end of the year, the station became the most popular radio station in Poland according to listenership polls - with breaks, it still holds this position today.

On February 1, 1997, the station was launched in Olsztyn. On June 16, Hop Bęc chart was launched, which in its heyday (around 1999) was the most popular youth program in the country. Conducted from 26 June 1997, another edition of the "Inwazja Mocy" campaign was suspended for about a month due to the flood of the millennium - the station created "Inwazja Pomocy", supporting the rescue efforts of the services and reporting on them on air.

In January 1998, RMF FM journalists were the only Poles broadcasting from Baghdad, Kuwait and Bahrain during the crisis in the Persian Gulf. On 1 September the local station Opera FM (today RMF Classic) was launched in Kraków.

In March 1999, RMF FM journalists reported on the war in the Balkans. In July, the station conducted another edition of "Inwazja mocy", during which the largest gathering of people in Poland took place - about 3 million people. On 1 September 1999, the station took over the local radio station in Kraków - Blue FM (today Radio Eska Kraków).

2000's 
On 11 February 2000 Interia.pl, a subsidiary of RMF, was launched. On March 1 a correspondent in Berlin appeared and on December 7 the station, as the first of all national radio stations, appeared on the Wizja TV platform.

On 7 March 2001, the National Broadcasting Council renewed the station's license for another 10 years, but this time without the possibility of local splits. Due to this decision, on April 17, a picket of journalists and friends of the station was held in front of the Council's headquarters. However, the Council did not change its decision - on May 22, 2001 the new concession came into force, and on May 25, 2001 the broadcast of local programs was terminated. At the turn of July and August 2001 the station conducted a relief campaign for the flood victims in the Sucha Beskidzka area. On September 11, 2001, a few minutes before 3 p.m., information about the attack on the WTC was broadcast, followed by the longest news service in the history of Polish radio (the record was broken after the Smolensk disaster, also by RMF). Immediately after the attacks, reporters appeared in Pakistan, Afghanistan, the Persian Gulf, Israel and Bethlehem, reporting on the tensions following the attack.

On March 28, 2002, the station's signal was made available on the Internet. On 15th July 2002 RMF was the only radio station in Poland to interview President George Bush. In August the station broadcast the last pilgrimage of John Paul II to Poland. On 24th October 2002 the station won a lawsuit with the National Broadcasting Council for extending its license without the possibility of local broadcasts.

In 2003 RMF journalists were the only ones from Poland to report on the war in Iraq directly from Baghdad. On 11th April 2003 the RMF photo agency was founded and on 27th October 2003 the RMF Classic station was launched.

On 1 July 2004 RadioMan was launched, a Ukrainian radio project carried out in cooperation with RMF. On 14 July Broker FM, the owner of RMF, made its stock market debut. On September 27, RMF Maxxx was launched.

On 2 April 2005 at 21:55 the station announced the death of John Paul II. It then presented a multi-hour, all-night live program. The funeral of John Paul II was also broadcast on the station along with live entries of several journalists from different parts of the country. The station also extensively covered the attacks in Madrid and London as well as the MTK hall disaster and the Halemba mine disaster.

On 28 October 2006 it was announced that the station had been sold to the German publishing house Verlagsgruppe Bauer. On 30 April 2007 Miasto Muzyki (today operating as RMFon.pl) was established. In 2009, Wielka kumulacja was put on the air.

2010's 
Stanisław Smółka, one of the founders of the station, died on 7 February 2010. On April 10, 2010 the station reported extensively on the Smolensk catastrophe, broadcasting two editions of Facts which lasted 21.5 hours. During the funeral of Lech and Maria Kaczynski another several hour long newscast was aired. After the ceremony, the station prepared a book of thanks for the President of Georgia, who despite the volcanic eruption arrived in Krakow with several stops, and a set of golf balls for Barack Obama, who due to the volcanic cloud did not make it to Poland and played golf during the funeral. There was also extensive coverage of the 2010 flood, during which the station collected over 30 tons of donations for flood victims.

In 2012, the station devoted much time to the EURO 2012. Two years later, it covered the canonization of John Paul II, and also created the campaign "RMF i przyjaciele", inviting its listeners to a dinner created from dishes present in the cards of restaurants where politicians were recorded during the so-called tape scandal.

The station celebrated its 25th anniversary in 2015 and its 30th anniversary in 2020.

Listenership 
According to the Radio Track survey (performed by Millward Brown SMG/KRC), RMF FM's share in terms of listening between January and March 2017 in the 15-75 age group was 24.8 percent, which gave the station the position of radio market leader in Poland.

Advertising campaigns 
RMF FM organizes advertising campaigns such as "Najlepsza Muzyka" ("Best Music"), "Jak zawsze RMF FM" ("As always RMF FM") or "Oddałem głos na muzykę" ("I voted for music"). All campaigns feature Polish and world music stars.

The management of RMF FM and its journalists 

 Tadeusz Soltys - Chairman and Programme Director
 Iwona Bołdak - Deputy Programme Director
 Przemysław Kula - Deputy Programme Director
 Adam Czerwiński - Music Director
 Marek Balawajder - Information Director
 Blanka Baranowska - Deputy Information Director
 Bartłomiej Eider - Editorial Director of RMF Warszawa

The names of RMF FM journalists can be found on this category on Polish Wikipedia.

Sister stations

RMF Classic 
RMF Classic is a subject of RMF FM which mostly plays classical music. It originally started off as OPERA FM, which broadcast music produced by an opera. In 2003, the format, as well as the name, was changed, creating the project that is known as RMF Classic.

RMF MAXX 
RMF MAXX is a contemporary hit radio which started broadcasting on 27 September 2004.

Broadcasts and their hosts

Currently 

 Fakty RMF FM
 Wstawaj, szkoda dnia – Przemysław Skowron, Mariusz Kałamaga, Tomasz Olbratowski
 Byle do piątku – Daniel Dyk, Krzysztof Urbaniak
 Felieton – Tomasz Olbratowski
 Lepsza połowa dnia – Mateusz Opyrchał, Jacek Tomkowicz
 Poplista/Poplista Plus – Dariusz Maciborek
 Dobra nocka – no hosts
 Poranek RMF FM – Natalia Kawałek, Jacek Tomkowicz
 Kawałek weekendu – Krzysztof Urbaniak, Paweł Jawor
 Disco RMF – Marcin Jędrych
 Lepiej być nie może – Aleksandra Filipek, Krzysztof Urbaniak
 Numer za numerem – Mariusz Opyrchał
 Sceny zbrodni – Daniel Dyk, Kamil Barnowski
 Historia dla dorosłych – Przemysław Skowron, Jacek Tomkowicz, Tomasz Olbratowski
 Twoje 5 minut
 RMF FM do samochodu

Some broadcasts in the past 

 Buntownik z wyboru – Marek Piekarczyk, Aleksandra Filipek Krzysztof Urbaniak
 Byle do piątku – Robert Konatowicz, Małgorzata Kościelniak, Krzysztof Urbaniak, Kamil Baleja, Sławomir Kowalewski, Robert Karpowicz, Ewelina Pacyna
 Czas się śmieje – Michał Figurski
 Co ludzie powiedzą – Aleksandra Filipek
 Dobry wieczór – Marcin Jędrych, Krzysztof Urbaniak, Daniel Dyk, Sławomir Kowalewski, Tomasz Brhel, Kamil Baleja
 Dobrze zagrane – Marcin Jędrych, Tomasz Brhel, Aleksandra Filipek
 Eurochart 100 – Marcin Jędrych
 Gorące numery gwiazd – Marcin Jędrych
 Gwiazdozbiór Smoka – Marcin Jędrych
 Imprezowy piątek – Marcin Jędrych, Jacek Tomkowicz, Joanna Meus
 Imprezowy weekend – Marcin Jędrych, Mateusz Opyrchał
 JW 23 – Marcin Jędrych, Marcin Wrona, Witold Odrobina
 Kawałek weekendu – Marcin Jędrych
 Krakowskie Przedmieście 27 – Tomasz Skory i Konrad Piasecki, Piotr Salak i Ryszard Cebula
 Koniec wieku – Piotr Metz
 Kontrwywiad RMF FM – Kamil Durczok, Konrad Piasecki
 Lepsza połowa dnia – Katarzyna Wilk i Kamil Baleja
 Lista Hop-Bęc – Marcin Jędrych
 Metzoforte – Piotr Metz, Marcin Jędrych i Tomasz Słoń
 Na językach – Marzena Rogalska
 Ni w 5 ni w 9 – Tadeusz Sołtys i Michał Kubik
 Przesłuchanie – Tomasz Skory, Agnieszka Burzyńska, Mariusz Piekarski
 Przepis na weekend – Kamil Baleja
 Przebój za przebojem – Marcin Jędrych, Joanna Meus
 Polityczne graffiti – Tomasz Skory, Brian Scott, Ryszard Cebula, Konrad Piasecki i Paweł Pawlik
 Poplista plus impreza – Dariusz Maciborek, Marcin Jędrych
 Popołudniowa Rozmowa Dnia – Tomasz Skory, Mariusz Piekarski, Roman Osica
 Poliż temat – Ewa Błachnio, Robert Korólczyk, Mariusz Kałamaga
 Poza zasięgiem – Stanisław Smółka
 Radio Muzyka Fakty – Tadeusz Sołtys, Jacek Stawiski, Ewa Drzyzga, Ewa Stykowska, Edward Miszczak, Marcin Wrona, Bogdan Rymanowski i Grażyna Bekier
 Radioturniej – Michał Figurski
 RMF Extra – Marta Grzywacz i Piotr Jaworski
 Rockandrollowa historia świata – Marcin Jędrych, Marek Piekarczyk
 Rozmowy w biegu – Maciej Dowbor
 Rozmowy podsłuchiwane – Jacek Żakowski i Piotr Najsztub
 Szkółka niedzielna – Brian Scott i Paweł Pawlik
 Świat filmu według Andrzeja Sołtysika – Andrzej Sołtysik
 Świat na głowie – Marcin Jędrych, Tomasz Olbratowski
 Tego jeszcze nie grali – Paweł Jawor, Mateusz Opyrchał
 Ten Top – Marcin Jędrych
 To lubię! – Ewa Farna
 Tydzień z głowy – Ewelina Pacyna
 Wasza muzyka – Ewa Drzyzga, Dariusz Maciborek, Piotr Metz, Robert Konatowicz, Mirosław Golański, Robert Janowski, Tomasz Brhel
 Wolno wstać – Jan Burda, Sławomir Kowalewski
 Wolne żarty – Krzysztof Urbaniak, Karol Modzelwski
 Wszystkie struny świata – Robert Konatowicz
 Wszystkie numery Agnieszki Chylińskiej – Agnieszka Chylińska
 Wszystko w temacie – Marcin Jędrych, Krzysztof Urbaniak
 Wstawaj szkoda dnia – Tadeusz Sołtys, Michał Kubik, Beata Fiedorow, Piotr Urbaniak, Witold Lazar, Sylwia Paszkowska, Marcin Ziobro, Robert Karpowicz, Kamil Baleja
 Z góry na dół – Edward Miszczak
 Za dużo, za mało – Andrzej Sołtysik, Stanisław Smólka, Andrzej Roszak, Marcin Wrona, Ewa Drzyzga

Frequency FM in Poland

References

External links
RMF FM webpage

Radio stations in Poland
Mass media in Kraków
Radio stations established in 1990